Advance is an unincorporated community and census-designated place (CDP) in Charlevoix County in the U.S. state of Michigan.  The population of the CDP was 340 in the 2020 census and 328 in the 2020 census.  It is located along Lake Charlevoix within Eveline Township.

History
Advance was settled in Eveline Township as early as 1866 along the shores of Pine Lake (now known as Lake Charlevoix).  Advance has its own post office from October 20, 1870 until October 15, 1906. 

The community of Advance was listed as a newly defined census designated place for the 2010 census, meaning it now has officially defined boundaries and population statistics for the first time.

Geography

Demographics

Education
The community of Advance is served primarily by Boyne City Public Schools to the east in Boyne City.  A smaller western portion of the community may be served by East Jordan Public Schools to the south in East Jordan.

References 

Unincorporated communities in Charlevoix County, Michigan
Unincorporated communities in Michigan
Census-designated places in Charlevoix County, Michigan
Census-designated places in Michigan
Populated places established in 1866
1866 establishments in Michigan